Arun Lal (born 26 August 1985) is a Pakistani first-class cricketer who plays for Quetta cricket team.

References

External links
 

1985 births
Living people
Pakistani cricketers
Quetta cricketers
Cricketers from Quetta